Charlotte Hook (born January 29, 2004 in Cary, North Carolina) is an American swimmer. She competed in the women's 200 metre butterfly event at the 2021 FINA World Swimming Championships (25 m) in Abu Dhabi, winning the silver medal.

References

External links
 

2004 births
Living people
American female butterfly swimmers
Medalists at the FINA World Swimming Championships (25 m)
People from Cary, North Carolina
21st-century American women